The Rostock Peace Treaty was a treaty, or Landfriede, agreed on 13 June 1283 in Rostock to secure the peace on land and at sea, as well as the protection of taxes and other freedoms. The parties to the treaty agreed that, for ten years, they would avoid the use of force in exercising their rights. This treaty was the foundation for the economic growth of Wismar and other medieval seaports on the Baltic Sea.

The signatories to the treaty were the Hanseatic towns of Lübeck, Rostock, Wismar, Stralsund, Greifswald, Stettin, Demmin and Anklam as well as the dukes of Saxony and Pomerania, the Prince of Rügen, the lords of Schwerin and Dannenberg as well as the lesser nobility of Rostock.

Literature 
 Wolf-Dieter Mohrmann: Der Landfriede im Ostseeraum während des späten Mittelalters, 1972, 

Medieval law
Rostock 1283
Hanseatic League
Legal history of Germany
Treaties of Mecklenburg
History of Lübeck
Rostock
Wismar
1283 in Europe
Treaties of the Duchy of Pomerania
Treaties of the Free City of Lübeck
Treaties of the Duchy of Saxony
Treaties of the Principality of Rügen
1280s in the Holy Roman Empire
1280s treaties